Hungarian Civic Union may refer to:

Fidesz – Hungarian Civic Union, a centre-right political party in Hungary
Another name for the Hungarian Civic Party, a political party representing the Hungarian minority in Romania